Child of Our Time is a documentary commissioned by the BBC, co-produced with the Open University and presented by Robert Winston. It follows the lives of 25 children, born at the beginning of the 21st century, as they grow from infancy, through childhood, and on to becoming young adults.

Programme
The aim of the series is to build up a coherent and scientifically accurate picture of how the genes and the environment of growing children interact to make a fully formed adult. A large portion of the series is made up of experiments designed to examine these questions. The main topic under consideration is: "Are we born or are we made?". The nature of the family in contemporary Britain is also addressed.

The project is planned to run for 20 years, following its subjects from birth until the age of 20. During the first half of its run a set of about three or four episodes was produced annually. After 2008 new episodes became less frequent, and in 2011 there was some doubt about the future of the programme, including from Winston himself. In February 2013 it was announced that the series would resume, with two new episodes presented by Winston. Rather than the psychological experiments of previous series, these episodes focused on the first interviews with the participating children themselves and their families.

The children

The 25 children that feature in the programme were born to 22 families between January and February 2000. They were chosen in order to represent a wide range of genetic, social, geographical and ethnic backgrounds. They are:
 Alex and Ivo: Identical twins Alex and Ivo Lloyd Young were born eleven weeks early to parents Berenice Lloyd and Alastair Young. The family lives in Glasgow. Alex and Ivo are still as close as ever and are both at Glasgow University, where Alex is studying Immunology and Ivo is studying Maths & Physics.
 Calvin: Born ten weeks early to parents Helen Kirkham and Andy Pearson, Calvin has an older sister, Lauren. Helen and Andy have now split up. He has become known online and through social media due to being a strong advocate of LGBTQ+ rights for struggling teens.
 Charlie: Charlie's mother Toni was sixteen when she fell pregnant with her daughter Charlie. Toni's mother and grandmother also had babies early. Toni split up with Charlie's father before Charlie was born and fell in love with electrician Rob Plaster. Rob treats Charlie like his own daughter and he and Toni have had two more children Kayla and Alex. They have separated since. Toni works as a nurse.
 Charlotte: Charlotte Langeveld was born as a result of IVF treatment to parents Richard and Jacqui. She had a twin brother, Alexander, who was stillborn. Her parents married three months after the birth of Charlotte's sister Jasmine, but have now divorced. They try to remain amicable for the sake of their daughters. She working as an office administrator in London now.
 Charlotte: Charlotte Goldsmith was born in Essex . She has one older brother and her parents Emma and Paul separated six months after her birth. After going into care at the age of 5, Charlie is now living independently. She dedicates her time to caring for her 1-year-old son Elijah.
 Ethan: Before Ethan's birth his mother Kerri lost two female babies; one was miscarried and one was stillborn. She also lost Ethan's twin through miscarriage in the third month of pregnancy. Ethan loves playing computer games but struggles at school and has been diagnosed with attention deficit hyperactivity disorder (ADHD) and Asperger syndrome. Ethan had a problem with his speech which affected his ability to make friends in school, but it resolved itself soon after. Ethan and his family live in Northern Ireland and he studies Computer Science.
 Eve: Eve's parents, Tim and Caroline Scarborough, are Evangelical Christians who tried for years to conceive a baby through IVF but were unsuccessful. Eve was unplanned and conceived naturally. Her parents were delighted but Caroline had post-natal depression. Eve has a younger sister, Holly, born in 2005. It was announced at the end of the episode The Age of Stress that Caroline, Eve's mother, had died from cancer in 2008. Tim is now remarried, and Eve has two stepsisters. In the 2017 series Eve and her father describe how she came out as a lesbian aged 14. Eve is now a student midwife based in Keele and enjoying living with her new friends whilst she fulfils her dreams of working with women and babies. In the last episode Eve also discusses her mental health.
 Helena: Born at just twenty-five weeks, Helena is the sole survivor of triplets. Because of her premature birth her doctors believed she would have major respiratory and developmental problems. Helena did not crawl until eighteen months and did not speak her first word until two years. However Helena learned to walk, talk, run and join in with everything and became advanced intellectually. She is now happy, confident loving older sister to Bella. Helena's parents decided to separate after 13 years of marriage. Helena has just started her second year studying Drama and Performance Practice at Cheltenham Uni and is busy exploring options for her future career.
 Het: Born to parents Vijay and Tejal in a close-knit, extended family, Het speaks both English and her first language of Gujarati. In 2005 Het's mother became pregnant and had a baby in October. Het loves dancing and studies to become an astrophysicist at Imperial College in London.
 James: James' mother Carol comes from a very disadvantaged background and has a learning disability. She split up from the father of her elder child Bernie and James's father. James has asthma and was kidnapped at age five by Carol's ex-boyfriend, Ian.
 Jamie: After experiencing post-natal depression with her two eldest children, Sharon Craven was sterilised; it did not work and she became pregnant with Jamie, who was slow to learn to talk and speak. Doctors diagnosed a hearing problem so had grommets put in his ears, after which he blossomed. Jamie was diagnosed with Diabetes mellitus type 1 aged just four years old. His condition needs constant monitoring and frequent injections. At 16 years old he had a near fatal incident when he was in a diabetic coma. Jamie is currently working as sous chef he and his girlfriend are expecting a baby in 2020.
 Mabel, Alice and Phoebe: Non-identical triplets Mabel, Alice and Phoebe have three elder siblings. Their parents Nigel and Tracey Baller claim to be calm and easygoing with all the children. The triplets have developed different temperaments; Mabel is more outgoing. She is attending tertiary education, Alice is soft-spoken and Phoebe is more introvert and loves horses. Triplets Alice, Mabel and Phoebe have now all ventured into the world of work. Alice is working as a Dental Nurse, Mabel a Shop Supervisor and Phoebe is working at a research facility. Mabel and Phoebe now both have children. 
 Matthew (known as Matt in 2017 series): The younger brother of Robert and the second son of Kathryn and Graham Singleton, Matthew as child was sweet, slightly shy and anxious. Matt is in his first year studying Sports Management at Northumbria University.
 Megan: Megan is the daughter of Rhodri, a Welsh farmer, and Gaynor Davies. She has one older brother and sister. She is studying economics at University now.
 Nathan: A cheery, enthusiastic boy who is being brought up by parents Ruth and Richard Price. Nathan was a big baby and is being brought up by his parents with strong values. The family spent several years living a self-sufficient, organic lifestyle in the countryside, but eventually moved to be closer to the school Nathan is in. Nathan's parent have split up but continue to live in the same place and are best friends. Nathan's father was revealed to be gay and both parents have their own relationships. Nathan has a great relationship to his father. He is an artist and studies fine arts at university
 Parys: Parys is the son of artist Alison Lapper, a single mother. Alison is disabled, born with no arms and very short legs. While pregnant with Parys, she had casts made of her body to create a giant marble statue of her. Artist Marc Quinn created this statue, which was placed on the fourth plinth of Trafalgar Square in 2005–2007. Alison has also written an autobiography, entitled My Life in My Hands. Parys was born by caesarean section and did not sleep well as a baby. He had a lot of carers helping Alison take care of him over the years and had a strong bond with his mother. Parys died of an accidental drug overdose in August 2019.
 Rebecca: A very small child whose parents Mark and Gill Saunders are Jewish. Rebecca has an older brother. Rebecca is currently studying geography at the University of Nottingham
 Rhianna: The only child of Tanya Knights and Andy Lees, Rhianna is fascinated by nature and history. It was mentioned in the 2017 series that Tanya and Andy had separated. She is attending University
 Rubin: Rubin was born at thirty seven weeks and rushed to intensive care. He had to be hospitalised again at two months old as he contracted pneumonia. Rubin is the third of four boys; mother Debbie Bayfield was single for a while but married the father of her fourth son. In 2008, he gained a place at the Choral school in Westminster.
 Taliesin: Taliesin is the second child and first son of Olivia and Robin Stevenson who split up before his birth but got back together again. Olivia became a teenage mother with Taliesin's sister, Emily, and left education behind at an early age after being bullied. Taliesin is currently studying Politics and International Relations at Essex
 Tyrese: Tyrese is the third child and first son of  Marie and Jamal Haqib in inner-city Birmingham. Marie, who is dyslexic, had strong designs for Tyrese's future, considering he was a black male in the UK. His parents got divorced when he was three. Aged 20, Tyrese was charged with, and later jailed for, offences related to drug dealing 
 William (known as Will in 2017 series): Keen on sport and outperforming, as well as harassing his older brother, William was born by caesarean and lives in a small town in Yorkshire. He is now studying at a university in the US on a Tennis scholarship

Episode guide

Child of Our Time - the Children's Stories 
In 2006, there was a spin-off series showing a 30-minute programme each week on one child and their story so far from birth to the age of 6.

See also
Up series (a similar series of documentary films that have followed the lives of fourteen British children since 1964).
 Born to be Different (a similar series focusing on children with a disability).

References

External links 
 
 

2000 British television series debuts
2020 British television series endings
2000s British documentary television series
2010s British documentary television series
2020s British documentary television series
BBC television documentaries
POV (TV series) films
Documentary films about children
BBC high definition shows
Biographical documentary films
Cohort studies
Child welfare in the United Kingdom
English-language television shows